George Thomson was a Scottish footballer who played as a left half, mainly for Aberdeen, where he featured prominently between 1933 and the outbreak of World War II in 1939.

His most notable achievement was appearing in the 1937 Scottish Cup Final which Aberdeen lost 2–1 to Celtic; the Dons were also runners-up in the 1936–37 Scottish Division One table behind Rangers, having been third behind the Old Firm teams the previous season – Thomson missed only six matches across those two campaigns. After playing for several teams during the war (winning the Southern League, Glasgow Cup and Southern League Cup with Rangers in the 1941–42 season), he formally joined Dunfermline Athletic in early 1946, but was released prior to the resumption of official competitions.

References

Year of birth missing
20th-century births
Year of death missing
Scottish footballers
Association football wing halves
Scottish Football League players
Scottish Junior Football Association players
Clyde F.C. wartime guest players
Rangers F.C. wartime guest players
Dundee United F.C. wartime guest players
Aberdeen F.C. players
Dunfermline Athletic F.C. players
St Roch's F.C. players